Gameforge is a video game publisher and video game developer. It represents a group of companies that operates internationally and has its headquarters in Karlsruhe, Germany. It distributes roughly 20 games, translated into over 50 languages. 
Their portfolio contains client-based massively multiplayer online games (MMOGs) such as TERA, Metin2, Runes of Magic, and SOLO, as well as browser-based online games such as OGame, Gladiatus, BiteFight, and Ikariam. They also operate mobile games. Gameforge employs a staff of over 300 and was founded by its Chief Executive Officer Alexander Rösner and former CEO Klaas Kersting in 2003.

Business Model 
Gameforge was one of the first European companies  to offer its games using a free-to-play business model. Game access and clients are mostly free of charge. The products are financed by shop systems where players can buy comfort and service functions such as mounts to ride, or equipment and personalisations for money. Gameforge was one of the first western companies to adapt to this invariably important business model that has its origins in Asia.

History 
The company was founded in December 2003 under the name of Gameforge GmbH in Karlsruhe by Alexander Rösner and Klaas Kersting.  One of the company’s first titles was OGame which Alexander Rösner had developed prior to the company foundation all by himself. In September 2006, the company’s legal structure was converted into an incorporated company which took the name Gameforge AG. It functions as a holding of the affiliated company Gameforge 4D GmbH.  Gameforge currently operates and markets twelve client-based online games, nine browser games and five mobile games.

2003 to 2010 
The years from 2006 to 2010 were characterised by a strong growth in the number of players and employees. In 2007, the company had about 100 employees; the number increased to 200 by the end of 2008, to 360 by the end of 2009 and finally, to 450 in 2010 (650 including those from Frogster Interactive Pictures AG). In November 2011, the company announced a realignment of internal structures. Following the integration of Gameforge and Frogster's operating units, "Client Games" and "Web Games" were replaced with "Development" and "Publishing" sections. In addition to structural measures, the workforce was reduced and products that were not meeting expectations were adjusted. In 2009, the company reached the mark of 100 million registered players. By the end of 2010, the number grew to 200 million and, in 2011, to 300 million. The number currently stands (December 2013) at about 400 million registered players.

In 2007, Gameforge founded its first foreign branch, Gameforge SARL, established in Paris. After buying French development studio Nevrax, the subsidiary was commissioned to market the game “The Saga of Ryzom”. It was only a moderate success, leading to the sale of Ryzom in 2009. Gameforge owned other offices abroad, including Gameforge Holding Malta Ltd. with headquarters in Pietà. In November 2007, Gameforge ventured into the U.S. market as the first German online games company and founded Gameforge Productions Inc. based in San Francisco. Lars Koschin was placed in charge of branch management overseas.
On April 23, 2008, Gameforge announced the establishment of four development studios. “Ticking Bomb Games”, based in Hamburg, was to develop several PC games, then be marketed by Gameforge. Managing directors were Tobias Severin and Marco Schultz; who both already had many years of experience in the game development field. Ralf C. Adam was introduced as a consultant, allowing them to make use of his 16 years’ professional experience. Their first game, Gilde1400, a browser game based on PC game “The Guild”, was released late October 2009. The beta phase ran for two weeks before it was published.
The end of January 2009 brought the establishment of the second developer, “Rough Sea Games”, based in Mannheim, Germany. Just like Ticking Bomb, the studio was to take over development of PC and browser games. Matthias Schindler was elected CEO. He had been working in the game development for 15 years.
In addition to the Hamburg and Mannheim studios, the company also co-operated with two other development studios: “Steroid Interactive” (Mainz) and “Inflammables” (Heidelberg). All four studios were gradually decommissioned: the offices in Hamburg, Mainz and Mannheim were sold on 1 January 2011; Inflammables closed with the end of Hellbreed in late 2011.
At the end of 2008, the foundation of a subsidiary in the United States together with Frogster Interactive Pictures AG was unveiled. Gameforge was to be the primary stakeholder with 75 percent and following the purchase of 470,000 shares it was to then have acquired a stake of up to 20 percent from Frogster. However this joint venture was not achieved: conflicts of interest arose regarding the details. The company chose instead to become active with its own subsidiary, Frogster America Inc.

2010 onwards 
On March 19, 2010, Klaas Kersting, former CEO of Gameforge AG, announced his departure from the company.

During 2010 Gameforge took a majority stake in Frogster Interactive Pictures AG, further expanding its share. On July 3, 2012, a rebranding of its subsidiary Frogster Interactive Pictures AG and associated subsidiary companies was announced. Frogster was renamed Gameforge Berlin AG, subsidiary Frogster Online Gaming GmbH was merged into Gameforge Berlin AG. Frogster America Inc. was renamed to Gameforge America Inc. Frogster Pacific GmbH to Gameforge Pacific GmbH.

Starting 2011, an increasing saturation of the entire industry began to spread. Though sales still made up EUR 133 million in 2010, in 2011 it rose only to EUR 140 million. This was despite the number of players rising by a third from 200 million (August 2010) to 300 million (August 2011). The result was the dismissal of 100 employees in November 2011, as well as the shutdown of recently launched games Hellbreed and Mythos. Production of the much-anticipated Star Trek: Infinite Space was postponed and, after an unsuccessful search for a co-publisher, finally stopped a year later. Frogster even had a sales decline of 16% on the previous year. Competitors such as Zynga and Bigpoint also had similar problems, leading to layoffs and closures of subsidiaries and games.
In January 2012, Gameforge sold subsidiary Chili Entertainment GmbH to Hitfox for an undisclosed amount. The online advertising portal Ad2Games was sold with it.
In the second half of 2012, Gameforge ventured into the mobile games market. This began with five "first generation" games, all very similar in gameplay. These games are free of charge to download and finance themselves via a built-in shop and micropayment system. In early 2013, Crystal Runner: The Forgotten Caves, a more complex “second generation” mobile title, was published. Players had to pay a fee for installation. Mobile games were already contributing several million euros to consolidated revenues in 2013.

Furthermore, Special Force II became the first shooter the company has ever licensed. In May 2012, the company released TERA, which started as a pay-to-play title with monthly costs for game access, and was then converted to the company’s usual free-to-play model in February 2013. Until that point, all games that the company offered (with the exception of one single mobile game) were free to play and financed through micro transactions.

In November 2012, it was announced that the marketing departments of offices in Berlin and Karlsruhe were to be merged, leading to 20 jobs being cut within marketing, PR and business development. In the same month, the company announced a separation from the former CEO of Frogster Online Gaming GmbH, Seth Iorio. A closure of the Berlin site was not considered. On April 22, 2013, Gameforge revealed that the location in Berlin was to be dissolved from the 30th of September 2013. Organizational and economic motives were stated as reasons. CEO Alexander Rösner announced that the remaining 150 (approx.) employees were offered continued employment at the Karlsruhe offices.
In 2008, Gameforge won the Red Herring 100 Europe Award as the only German game company. Additionally, the two founders and former CEOs Klaas Kersting and Alexander Rösner were elected entrepreneurs of the year in 2008.

In 2016, Gameforge announced the layoff of approximately 90 employees, mostly from its mobile division, as it shifts its focus away from the mobile platform. CEO Alexander Rösner explained that the shift was being born out of increased opportunity in the Free-to-play marketplace. Previous to the layoffs, it was reported that Gameforge was unsuccessful in the mobile market. As of July 2018, the company employs 300 people.

In the summer of 2018 as well as summer of 2019, Gameforge supported the Schlosslichtspiele of Karlsruhe as a Main Partner and got to use the palace's facade as a giant canvas projecting digital artwork enjoyed by hundreds of thousands of guests that visited the palace grounds.

In January 2022, Gameforge announced the company's first partnership with an indie developer, the Russian studio Sernur.Tech, to release Trigon: Space Story, a single-player roguelike videogame. Six months later, Gameforge announced another single-player roguelite and partnership with an indie studio, Whiteboard Games, to release the twin-stick shooter I See Red.

Awards 
In the years 2008 and 2009, Gameforge won the Technology Fast 50 Award. While Gameforge won the award in the category "Rising Stars" in 2008, the company was already entered in the normal category in 2009 and was able to reach second place with a 5-year growth of 6261.19 or 19 percent, more than 2000 percent ahead of Bigpoint GmbH, their closest competitor. Likewise, Gameforge won two Stevie Awards as the "Most Innovative Company of the Year in Europe" and "Best New Product or Service of the Year - Media & Entertainment " in 2009 and was able to prevail against Bigpoint. In the same year, the company won the "Technology Pioneer" award presented by the World Economic Forum Davos.
In 2010, Gameforge was named "TOP JOB: Top Employer" and "Great Place to Work" in the context of "100 Best Companies to Work for in Germany 2010".

In 2011, “Computerwoche” placed Alexander Rösner at number 42 of the 100 "most important figures in the German IT". In addition, Gameforge won a "Stevie International Business Award" for the games portal Gameforge.com as well as a "Distinguished Honoree" award for the Star Trek: Infinite Space trailer.

In 2012, further awards followed, with the Red Herring Award and the Silver Award at the International Business Awards (Stevies)

In 2019, Gameforge was found among the winners of this year’s Great Place to Work® competition for the Best Employers in Baden-Württemberg as well as one of the best ITC companies in Germany and received the Great Place to Work® certification.

Current games

References

External links
Gameforge AG (German branch)
Gameforge Productions INC. (U.S. branch)

Video game companies of Germany
Companies established in 2003
Browser-based game websites
Gaming miniatures companies
Companies based in Baden-Württemberg
Companies based in Karlsruhe